The 1986 ADAC Kouros 1000 km Nürburgring was the seventh round of the 1986 World Sports-Prototype Championship.  It took place at the Nürburgring, West Germany on August 24, 1986.

Report

Entry

For this round, a total of 41 entered for the race, however only 34 of these arrived in the Eifel mountains for the practice and qualifying.

Qualifying

Thierry Boutsen took pole position for Brun Motorsport, in their Porsche 956 he shared with the team’s owner, Walter Brun, averaging a speed of 117.102 mph.

Race

Low cloud and rain fell on the circuit throughout the beginning of the race, causing a multitude of accidents and spins.  Although the Sauber C8 generally lacked effective ground effects, it was reliable but off the pace of the Porsches and Jaguars, but the poor weather allowed Mike Thackwell to drive brilliantly on his Goodyear rain tyres to pass Hans-Joachim Stuck in the works Porsche 962C, leading the race on merit. However, a collision between the Argo-Zakspeed of Martin Schanche and the Tiga-Ford of Roy Baker, which required the deployment of the safety car on Lap 22. As the safety car was deployed however, low visibility and confusion over the state of the caution led to the two works Rothmans Porsches of Stuck and Jochen Mass colliding on the front stretch, heavily damaging both cars.  Due to the amount of debris littering the track, the event was stopped for two hours.

Believing the track to be unsafe in the continuing wet conditions, three Porsche teams chose to withdraw from the event.  These included the three Brun cars, as well as the Joest and Kremer car.  The race was restarted behind the pace car, but timing was on aggregate.

At the restart, Thackwell kept control of the race, and although Derek Warwick’s Jaguar passed him as the circuit dried out, the British car later retired with a broken oil line. The remaining Porsche teams were unable to keep up with the Sauber or Jaguar. There was nothing, then to Henri Pescarolo from completing the shorten race distance giving Sauber its first-ever World Championship success. It also, marked the first victory by a Mercedes-Benz in the World Championship since the 1955 24 Hours of Le Mans.

The Sauber triumphed in a time of 3hr 42:30.020, averaging a speed of 92.626mph. Second place went to the Liqui Moly Equipe pairing of Klaus Niedzwiedz and Mauro Baldi aboard the Porsche 956 GTi, who was two laps adrift. The podium was completed by the Spanish partnership of Emilio de Villota and Fermín Vélez in their John Fitzpatrick Racing prepared Porsche 956.

Classification

Official results

Please note that the result was declared after 121 laps (598.6 km), instead of the full race distance.
Class winners in bold.  Cars failing to complete 75% of the winner's distance marked as Not Classified (NC).

 Fastest Lap: Klaus Niedzwiedz, 1:34.820secs (107.778 mph)

References

 
 

Nurburgring
6 Hours of Nürburgring
Nurburgring